Marcel Chládek (born April 9, 1968, Rakovník, Czech Republic) is a Czech social-democratic politician and former senator for Louny (2008 until 2014). He served as Minister of Education, Youth and Sports of the Czech Republic from 29 January 2014 until 6 June 2015.

References 

1968 births
Czech Social Democratic Party Senators
Education ministers of the Czech Republic
Living people
Charles University alumni
People from Rakovník